The Merida Andes tree frog (Hyloscirtus platydactylus) is a species of frogs in the family Hylidae found in Colombia and Venezuela. Its natural habitats are subtropical or tropical moist montane forests, rivers, and heavily degraded former forests. It is threatened by habitat loss.

Sources

Hyloscirtus
Amphibians of the Andes
Amphibians of Colombia
Amphibians described in 1905
Taxonomy articles created by Polbot